Balacra batesi is a moth of the family Erebidae. It was described by Herbert Druce in 1910. It is found in Angola, Cameroon, the Democratic Republic of the Congo, Equatorial Guinea, Ghana, Nigeria and Uganda.

References

Balacra
Moths described in 1910
Insects of Cameroon
Insects of the Democratic Republic of the Congo
Insects of West Africa
Insects of Uganda
Insects of Angola
Erebid moths of Africa